Tarepanda (たれぱんだ) is a cute panda character owned by the company San-X . The term "tare"  means "droopy" in Japanese.

History

Creation
Tarepanda is licensed by San-X, the company that introduced Tarepanda stickers in 1995.

Characteristics
Tarepanda is a character that moves by rolling over, with a record speed of 2.75 m/h. Tarepanda's favorite food is mochi , especially suama .

Popularity
In February 1998, San-X launched Tarepanda erasers and letter pads, which proved enormous hits. San-X believed these products were successful because they were released shortly after the Asian financial crisis of autumn 1997, a time when many people in Japan were facing layoffs and, consequently, were sympathetic toward a "worn-out" panda character. Sales of Tarepanda goods exceeded  in the first few months of its release. It became Japan's seventh top-grossing character of 1999, generating  in merchandise sales that year, adding up to  merchandise sales in Japan by 1999.

Tarepanda was a major hit in Japan. It has appeared on annual retail sales charts published by Character Databank, a Japanese character sales monitoring firm, . It was rated one of the most popular characters in Japan for its cuteness.

Merchandise

Picture books
 Tarepanda: Kyou mo Yoku Tareteimasu.  (Hikaru Suemasa, June 1999)
 Taregoyomi: Nengara Nenju Tareteimasu. (Hikaru Suemasa, September 1999)
 Taredzukushi: Tarepanda Fuanbukku (Hikaru Suemasa, March 2000)
 Tareyukumamani: Kigatsuku to Sobani iru (Hikaru Suemasa, April 2001)

Sticker books
 Tarepanda Shiiru (Hikaru Suemasa, March 2000)

Videos
 Tarepanda (Bandai Visual, VHS, 2000/7/25)
 Tarepanda (Bandai Visual, DVD, 2000/8/25)

Games
 Tarepanda no Gunpei (Bandai, WonderSwan, December 9, 1999)
 Taregoro: Tarepanda no Iru Nichijou (Bandai, PlayStation, August 31, 2000)

Computer
 Tarepanda (Interchannel, 2001/6/29, typing-tutor software)
 Tare Tsuzuri (Interchannel, 2001/11/22, card-creation software)
 Tarepanda Toissho (Fortyfive, 1999/4/16, desktop accessories)
 Tarepanda Toissho 2 (Fortyfive, 1999/8/10, desktop accessories)
 Tarepanda Toissho 3 (Fortyfive, 2000/4/28, desktop accessories)
 Tarepanda Toissho Tsume Awa Se (Fortyfive, 2002/2/8, desktop accessories)

References

San-X characters
Fictional pandas
Mascots introduced in 1995
Male characters in advertising